Georges Vanderhulst (born 15 July 1944) is a Belgian former field hockey player. He competed in the men's tournament at the 1968 Summer Olympics.

References

External links
 

1944 births
Living people
Belgian male field hockey players
Olympic field hockey players of Belgium
Field hockey players at the 1968 Summer Olympics
People from Ixelles
Field hockey players from Brussels